Melica brevicoronata, is a grass species in the family Poaceae that can be found in Brazil, southern South America, and Cerro Pan de Azúcar, Uruguay.

Description
The species is perennial with elongated rhizomes and pilose butt sheaths. Leaf-sheaths are tubular with one of their length being closed. They also have scabrous bottom, are pubescent and a bit hairy. The main panicle branches are spread out. Fertile spikelets have ciliated, curved and filiform pedicels.

Margins of lemma are ciliate. Palea have scaberulous keels and surface. Both the lower and upper glumes are obtuse and have asperulous surfaces.

References

brevicoronata
Flora of South America